Miguel Augusto Bombarda  (6 March 1851 – 3 October 1910) was a Portuguese physician, psychiatrist, and politician. He is perhaps most widely remembered as one of the major conspirators of the 5 October 1910 revolution, although he was shot and killed the day before the coup took place by one of his patients, Aparício Rebelo dos Santos.

Selected publications
Contribuição para o estudo dos microcephalus (1894)
Lições sobre a epilepsia e as pseudo-epilepsies (1896)
Estudos Biológicos. A Consciência e o Livre Arbítrio (1898)
A sciencia e o Jesuitismo: replica a um padre sabio (1900)

Distinctions

National orders
 Grand Cross of the Order of Saint James of the Sword (2 May 1906)

References

1851 births
1910 deaths
Assassinated Portuguese politicians
Deaths by firearm in Portugal
Grand Crosses of the Order of Saint James of the Sword
Male murder victims
People from Lisbon
Portuguese psychiatrists
Portuguese Republican Party politicians